Revenge is a Canadian war metal band formed in 2000 by James Read following the collapse of his previous outfit Conqueror. Revenge's chaotic black metal sound represents a direct continuation of Read's previous band's direction. Although sometimes referred to as war metal the band has never referred to themselves as war metal and has always called themselves black metal, chaotic black metal or black death metal. They have released six full-length albums to date. The band's lyrics explore among other things various militant themes of anti religion, anti humanity, self ascension and the collapse and rebuilding of mankind.

Biography
Following the demise of Canadian war metal band Conqueror, James Read formed Revenge in 2000 in Edmonton, Alberta, with the help of fellow scene veterans Ryan Förster (of Conqueror, Blasphemy and Domini Inferi) and Vermin (of Sacramentary Abolishment and Axis of Advance). Utilising the session musicians Attacker and Dehumanizer, the band recorded the Attack.Blood.Revenge 10-inch EP. The EP, which featured a cover of Bathory's "War", was released through Dark Horizon Records in 2001. The same year, Read joined French band Arkhon Infaustus for European touring, whilst also contributing session drums for fellow Canadians Axis of Advance.

In June 2002, Revenge was joined by Pete Helmkamp, of Order from Chaos and Angelcorpse notoriety, on bass and backing vocals. The band signed to the French label Osmose, who released Revenge's first full-length album, Triumph.Genocide.Antichrist, in 2003. Revenge also contributed the track "Deathless Will" to a split 7-inch single with Arkhon Infaustus, also released through Osmose. Two further albums emerged through Osmose, in 2004 and 2008 respectively, in much the same vein as previous Revenge and Conqueror releases. In 2011 Helmkamp left the band and was replaced with session member Haasiophis (Timothy Grieco, who also plays in "Antediluvian" and "Black Death Cult").

In January, 2015, Revenge played together with Mayhem and Watain as part of the "Black Metal Warfare" tour in the United States.

Line-up

Current members
 James Read (drums, studio vocals 2000–present)
 Vermin (studio guitars and bass, live vocals 2002–present)
 Haasiophis (live vocals and bass 2011–present)

Former members
 Pete Helmkamp (bass, live vocals 2002-2011)
 Attacker (session bass 2001-2002)
 Dehumanizer (session guitar 2001-2002)

R. Förster (Conqueror) is credited as a songwriter on a few Revenge songs that were created from unused Conqueror material, but he was never a member of Revenge nor played in any records.

Discography

Studio albums
 Triumph.Genocide.Antichrist (Osmose, 2003)
 Victory.Intolerance.Mastery (Osmose, 2004)
 Infiltration.Downfall.Death (Osmose, 2008)
 Scum.Collapse.Eradication (Nuclear War Now!, OSMOSE 2012)
 Behold.Total.Rejection (Season of Mist, 2015)
 Strike.Smother.Dehumanize (Season of Mist, 2020)

EPs
 Attack.Blood.Revenge (Dark Horizon, 2001)
 Superion.Command.Destroy (War Hammer, 2002)
 Split 7-inch with Arkhon Infaustus (Osmose, 2003)
 Retaliation.Doom.Eradication (Nuclear War Now!, 2012)
 Split 7-inch with Black Witchery (Nuclear War Now!, 2015)
 Deceiver.Diseased.Miasmic (Season of Mist, 2018)

References

External links

 Official Revenge Myspace
 Revenge biography @ Rockdetector
 Revenge @ Osmose

Canadian black metal musical groups
Musical groups from Edmonton
Musical groups established in 2000
Canadian musical duos
Heavy metal duos
2000 establishments in Alberta
Season of Mist artists